Sven Thorgren (born 4 October 1994) is a Swedish snowboarder who competes in slopestyle.

He started snowboarding when he was seven years old. He practiced every day after school on a small mountain called Väsjöbacken. Thorgren qualified for the 2014 Winter Olympics. On 6 February 2014 in the qualification event, Thorgren finished third in his heat and qualified directly to the finals. In the finals, he finished fourth. His most recent medal was at Air&Style, China, where he got the gold medal.

At FIS Snowboarding World Championships 2011 and 2013 finished 39th and 18th, respectively. His best World Cup result and the only podium before the 2014 Olympics was the third-place finish in Spindleruv Mlyn on 16 March 2013.

References

External links
 
 
 
 
 
 Thorgren Sochi profile at Sochi 2014 Olympics 
 Official website 

1994 births
Living people
Swedish male snowboarders
Olympic snowboarders of Sweden
People from Sollentuna Municipality
Snowboarders at the 2014 Winter Olympics
Snowboarders at the 2022 Winter Olympics
X Games athletes
Sportspeople from Stockholm County
21st-century Swedish people